The Church of Santíssima Trindade is an 18th-century church located in the civil parish of Fazenda in the municipality of Lajes das Flores, in the Portuguese island of Flores, in the archipelago of the Azores.

History
The beginnings of the church date back to the 16th century, during the early settlement of the region, when colonists began to populate the area known as Eirinha Velha, a sheltered zone of fertile lands.

On 1 August 1896, the first cornerstone was laid for the construction of the church, with the presence of the then-Bishop of Angra, D. Francisco José Ribeiro de Vieira e Brito, who was on an ecumenical visit to Flores. The church was built on lands bought from Maria do Rosário Vieira. The construction of the nave dates to 1897 and was only concluded in 1901, while the presbytery was finished in the next three years. It was master João Jacinto Teixeira, under the orientation of the vicar of Santa Cruz, monseigneur Henrique Augusto Ribeiro, that supported the construction of the temple. The church was finally consecrated on 25 March 1906, although further work in the interior persisted, with the execution of retables by Faialense artisan Manuel Augusto Ferreira da Silva.

At the same time, the curia of Senhor Santo Cristo da Fazenda das Lajes was installed in the community; the first was Father Francisco Cristiano Korth, whose stipend was paid by the locals.

In 1912, the image of the Bom Pastor (Good Shepard) was acquired by the congregation.

In December 1919, the civil  parish of Fazenda was created, following the de-annexation of the northern sections of Lajes. But, it was only on 10 November 1959, when the curia was elevated to the status of ecclesiastical parish, seated in the completed church dedicated to the Cult.

The construction of the northern sacristy only preceded in 1967, several years (1972-1973) before general renovations were initiated on the entire structure, owing to age.

Architecture
The church is situated north of the village of Lajes, in a small agglomeration of homes and social services, fronting the local greenspace/park. It is enclosed within a small walled courtyard on level ground, accessible by five steps.

The narrow, longitudinal plan consists of a single-nave and presbytery (more narrower) addorsed by a sacristy and spaces for storage and ecclesiastical classes, and covered in roofing tile. Three registers tall, the structure is divided by cornices and topped by a steeple-like belfry and cross with pyramidal pinnacles The distinct principal facade includes stonework embrasures and is decorated by monochromatic blue over white azulejo tile, with pilasters marking each register. The facade is marked by a rounded central portico over pilasters and lateral sections of complimentary picture windows, also with rounded windows. Over these windows are a group of three similar windows aligned to the ground floor, while the third register has the central steeple, supported by curvilinear flourishes/scrolls. Between the cornice and belltower on the front facade is an inscription marker S.C.M. 1891.

The interior consists of plastered and painted walls, with ceiling in curved wood. In the entranceway, the belltower creates a small nartex covered by a vault, while the lateral section to the right of the pulpit is the baptistry and, on the side of the epistole, a winding stone staircase to the high-choir. The high-choir is constructed of wood, with balustrade on the upper register, and windbreaker on the ground floor. In the main corp, over the exterior door is a plaque with the date 1967. Along the sides are rectangular doorways that access the sacristy and annexes. Opposite the epistle is a square pulpit, accessible by stonework and guarded in wood balustrade under cornice, from the anti-sacristy. The triumphal archway of the altar area is constructed over pilasters flanked by two collateral retables, placed on angles and decorated in polychromatic and gilded woodwork. From the presbytery, on either side, are doors that link the sacristy and annexes. On a cartouche over the window of the presbytery, opposite the epistle, is a plaque with the inscription 1901. From the anti-sacristy is a small washbasin and leads to the wood staircase to the pulpit.

References

Notes

Sources
 
 
 

Church Senhor Santo Cristo
Senhor Santo Cristo